Wedgefield is an unincorporated community in the High Hills of Santee area in western Sumter County, South Carolina, United States. Wedgefield is also a Census Designated Place (CDP). Wedgefield was so named because its location was likened to a "wedge" into the High Hills of Santee. In the 18th and 19th centuries it was the location of many plantations, notably those of the Singleton family, which produced First Lady of the United States, Angelica Singleton Van Buren. Today the plantations are gone except for their cemeteries and Wedgefield is today noted as the location of a state park, a state forest and other recreational places. When the railroad came through in the 19th century, the commercial center of Wedgefield developed at the intersection of the railroad, Kings Highway (South Carolina Highway 261) and Wedgefield Road (South Carolina Highway 763). It has its own post office with the Zip Code of 29168.

Wedgefield had a population of 3,376 in 2000 on a Zip Code-based estimate. Housing units were 1,343. Land area is  while water area is 0.33 square miles.

Places of interest

 High Hills Outdoor Center of the Palmetto Conservation Foundation is located at 2070 SC 261 South. in Wedgefield. It is the center for the High Hills of Santee Passage of the Palmetto Trail.
 Manchester State Forest, which extends into Clarendon County, is based in Wedgefield off SC 261 south at 6740 Headquarters Road.
 Poinsett State Park is located off SC 261 south at 6660 Poinsett Park Road, Wedgefield

Transportation
South Carolina Highway 261, Kings Highway,  is the main north–south road in Wedgefield. It runs north to Stateburg and south to Pinewood.  Wedgefield Road (South Carolina Highway 763) begins in Wedgefield and runs east to Sumter.
CSX Transportation, formerly the Seaboard Coast Line Railroad runs into Wedgefield from Sumter just north of Wedgefield Road and continues to the west. There is no passenger service to Wedgefield.

Cemeteries
Cemeteries in the Wedgefield area include:
 Singleton's Graveyard is on the National Register of Historic Places
 Troublefield Family Cemetery
 Wedgefield Baptist Church Cemetery
 Wedgefield Methodist Church Cemetery
 Wedgefield Presbyterian Church Cemetery

Notable people

 Richard Irvine Manning III, (1859-1931), Governor of South Carolina.
 Wyndham Meredith Manning, (1890-1967), South Carolina politician and son of Richard Irvine Manning III, born in Wedgefield.
 Angelica Singleton Van Buren, (1818–1877), First Lady of the United States, born and married in Wedgefield.

Media
WIBZ is licensed to Wedgefield.

References

External links
 Map of Sumter County
 Another map of Sumter County
 Topo Map of Wedgefield
 Places in Sumter District
 Singleton family index to Wedgefield

Coordinates 33.893° N80.518°W

Unincorporated communities in South Carolina
Unincorporated communities in Sumter County, South Carolina
High Hills of Santee

nl:Wedgefield
vo:Wedgefield